Pseudospiris is a monotypic moth genus of the family Noctuidae. Its only species, Pseudospiris paidiformis, is found in the Democratic Republic of the Congo, Tanzania, Malawi, Zambia, Zimbabwe and Zaire. Both the genus and species were first described by Arthur Gardiner Butler in 1895.

References

Agaristinae
Monotypic moth genera